Wolfy, the Incredible Secret is a 2013 French-Belgian animated film directed by Éric Omond. The film draws on the creations of artist, writer and illustrator Grégoire Solotareff, who created the character Loulou in the eponymous Children's book in 1989. The film was released in French theatres on 18 December 2013. It won the César Award for Best Animated Film at the 39th César Awards.

Cast 
 Malik Zidi as Loulou
 Stéphane Debac as Tom
 Anaïs Demoustier as Scarlett
 Carlo Brandt as Lou-Andrea
 Marianne Basler as Olympe
 Léonore Chaix as Cornélia
 Sarah-Jane Sauvegrain as Nina and Capitaine N
 Patrick Paroux as Momo
 Marie Berto as Rosetta
 Rémy Roubakha as Simon-Edgar Finkel
 John Arnold as Paul-Loup

References

External links 
Official trailer on YouTube (in French; English subtitles)

2013 films
Belgian animated films
French animated films
2010s French-language films
French-language Belgian films
2010s French films